Statignatha is a genus of moths belonging to the family Tortricidae.

Species
Statignatha novitana Kuznetzov, 1992
Statignatha primigena (Meyrick, 1912)

See also
List of Tortricidae genera

References

External links
tortricidae.com

Grapholitini
Tortricidae genera